Vidre may refer to:
 Joaquín Rodrigo Vidre (1901–1999), Spanish composer and pianist
 Vidre, Pljevlja, Montenegro